Chagrianda is a union council in the Kotli District of Azad Kashmir.

References

Union councils of Kotli District